Chamunda chamunda is a species of spread-winged skipper in the family Hesperiidae. It is the only species in the monotypic genus Chamunda and the monotypic subfamily Chamundinae. It is found from Assam to Burma, Thailand, Laos, Peninsular Malaysia and possibly Java.

References

External links

Natural History Museum Lepidoptera genus database

Butterflies described in 1866
Hesperiidae
Butterflies of Indochina
Taxa named by Frederic Moore